The Holm of Skaw is a small islet off the northeast coast of the island of Unst.
It is just northeast of the settlement of Skaw.
There is a lighthouse on the island.
Tidal currents are slack between Holm of Skaw and Herma Ness at high water, and the passage may be made by small boats.
The Skaw Röst, a dangerous tidal race, forms off the shore of the Holm of Skaw and Lamba Ness.

Gallery

References
Citations

Sources

Uninhabited islands of Shetland
Unst